Bruno Vieira do Nascimento (born 30 August 1985), simply known as Bruno, is a Brazilian professional footballer who plays as a right back.

Honours
Fluminense
 Campeonato Brasileiro Série A: 2012
 Campeonato Carioca: 2012
 Taça Guanabara: 2012
São Paulo
 Florida Cup (soccer): 2017

References

External links 
 Bruno Player profile

1985 births
Living people
Brazilian footballers
Esporte Clube Juventude players
Guarani FC players
Figueirense FC players
Fluminense FC players
São Paulo FC players
Esporte Clube Bahia players
Sport Club Internacional players
Campeonato Brasileiro Série A players
Campeonato Brasileiro Série B players
Association football defenders
People from Campo Grande
Sportspeople from Mato Grosso do Sul